Edo is a surname. People with the surname include:

 Ángel Edo (born 1970), Spanish cyclist
 Ariadna Edo Beltrán (born 1998), Spanish paralympic swimmer 
 Ini Edo (born 1982), Nigerian actress
 Luís Andrés Edo (1925–2009), Spanish militant and historian
 Teo Edo (born 1979), Spanish swimmer
 Yuma Edo (born 1993), Japanese swimmer

See also
 Edo (given name)